State Route 368 (SR 368) is a Tennessee designated state route in Grand Junction, Tennessee. It is approximately 1.7 miles long.

Route description

SR 368 begins as a fork in the road from SR 18 just north of town and travels nearly due south, intercepting Old Grand Junction Road and Summit Street. From this point it runs slightly parallel to the rarely used Mississippi Central Railroad and Tippah Street.  It intercepts SR 57 as a T-junction in downtown Grand Junction and stops there.

History
Tennessee State Route 368 was originally designated as Tennessee State Route 18A. The generally accepted theory for why this was done is that the road runs nearly parallel to Tennessee State Route 18, and only goes a short distance, ending in Grand Junction. Tennessee State Route 18A was redesignated as Tennessee State Route 368 in 1981 for unknown reasons.

Major intersections

See also
 Tennessee State Route 18
 Tennessee State Route 57
 Grand Junction, Tennessee
 Mississippi Central Railroad

References

368